Minerva's Visit to the Muses is an oil on oak panel painting by Flemish painter Joos de Momper. The painting depicts a scene from Ovid's Metamorphoses, which tells of Minerva visiting the muses on Mount Helicon, to listen to their song and see the Hippocrene. In the painting, the scene takes place in a wooded mountain side. At the same time, a pastel, distant landscape is depicted in the background. The painting is currently housed at the Royal Museum of Fine Arts in Antwerp.

Subject
In his metamorphoses, Ovid recounts:

Through all these mighty deedsPallas, Minerva, had availed to guide her gold-begotten brother. Now she sped, surrounded in a cloud, from Seriphus, while Cynthus on the right, and Gyarus far faded from her view. And where a path, high over the deep sea, leads the near way, she winged the air for Thebes, and Helicon haunt of the Virgin Nine. High on that mount she stayed her flight, and with these words bespoke those well-taught sisters; “Fame has given to me the knowledge of a new-made fountain—gift of Pegasus, that fleet steed, from the blood of dread Medusa sprung—it opened when his hard hoof struck the ground.—It is the cause that brought me.—For my longing to have seen this fount, miraculous and wonderful, grows not the less in that myself did see the swift steed, nascent from maternal blood.” [...] Pallas, after she had long admired that fountain, flowing where the hoof had struck, turned round to view the groves of ancient trees; the grottoes and the grass bespangled, rich with flowers unnumbered—all so beautiful she deemed the charm of that locality a fair surrounding for the studious days of those Mnemonian Maids.

Painting

Ovid tells about Minerva's visit to the muses on Mount Helicon. The goddess went there to listen to the muses' songs and behold Hippocrene, which sprung from a rock after Pegasus hit it with his hooves. In the painting, several muses are playing music in a wooded mountain side overlooking a dale. Pegasus is seen in the background on the top right corner. On the opposite corner, there walks in Minerva, with Medusa depicted on her shield.

As mentioned by Ovid, according to tradition, Pegasus and his brother Chrysaor sprang from the blood issuing from Medusa's neck as Perseus was beheading her. 

The way in which Pegasus was born is similar to the manner in which Athena was born from the head of Zeus. After beheading her, Perseus used Medusa's head, which retained its ability to turn onlookers to stone, as a weapon, and then gave it to Athena (Minerva) who placed it on her shield. 

In the painting, Minerva's association with the muses jibes with the former's identification as sponsor of the arts. A.P. de Mirimonde postulated that the work represents Minerva's visit to the Muses. The scene does not take place on the Parnassus, but on the Helicon, as evinced in the Hippocrene, "Horse's Fountain," stemming from beneath Pegasus's hooves.

The painting's landscape was realized by de Momper, while Hendrik van Balen painted the figures, and Jan Brueghel the Elder took care of the flowers. In the painting, the foreground gradually merges into the background. The latter's harmonious landscape jibes with the cheerful mood of the Greek mythological characters painted in the foreground.

References

External links
The painting at the Web Gallery of Art
Description of the painting and high quality image at Google Arts & Culture

16th-century paintings
17th-century paintings
Landscape paintings
Paintings by Joos de Momper
Paintings in the collection of the Royal Museum of Fine Arts Antwerp
Paintings based on Metamorphoses